Live at CBGB's also known as Live at CBGB's 1988 is the live album by the punk rock band Sham 69, was recorded in November 1988 and released in 1991 (see 1991 in music).

Track listing 
"How the Was Won" - 2:59
"Tell Us The Truth" - 2:37
"Wallpaper Song" - 4:25
"Rip and Tear" - 4:03
"Questions and Answers" - 3:50
"Caroline's Suitcase" - 3:41
"Vision and the Power" - 3:58
"The Bastard Club" - 5:45
"Borstal Breakout" - 3:32
"What Have We Got" - 2:04
"As Black as Sheep" - 5:15
"If the Kids Are United" - 4:33

References

Sham 69 live albums
1991 live albums
1998 live albums